The Roman Catholic Diocese of Gumaca (Lat: Dioecesis Gumacana) is a Roman Catholic diocese in the Philippines centered in the Municipality of Gumaca in Quezon province. The Roman Rite Latin Church diocese covers the communities of Gumaca; Pitogo, due south of Gumaca; and all the parishes of eastern Quezon province situated east of Gumaca and Pitogo.  The Gumaca diocese was erected in 1984, carved out from the Diocese of Lucena. Both dioceses are suffragan of the Archdiocese of Lipa.

Ordinaries

Priests of the Diocese who became Bishops
Jose Francisco Oliveros, DD. 2nd Bishop of the Diocese of Boac from 2000-2004 and 4th Bishop of the Diocese of Malolos from 2004 until his death in 2018.

Gallery

See also
Catholic Church in the Philippines

External links
Website of the Diocese of Gumaca

Gumaca
Gumaca
Gumaca
Roman Catholic dioceses and prelatures established in the 20th century
1984 establishments in the Philippines
Religion in Quezon